American singer Mary J. Blige began her career as a backing vocalist for Uptown Records in the early 1990s. In a career spanning more than thirty years, she has released 14 studio albums and 83 singles—including more than 20 as a featured artist. The “Queen of Hip-Hop Soul” has sold an estimate of over 100 million records worldwide, and over 20 million in the United States alone. Billboard ranked Blige as the 18th Greatest Billboard 200 Woman of all time, the 45th Greatest Hot 100 Woman of all time and 88th Greatest Artist of all time.

In 2009, Billboard magazine ranked Blige as the most successful female R&B/hip-hop artist of the past 25 years. In March 2017, Billboard magazine ranked her 2006 song "Be Without You" as the most successful R&B/hip-hop song of all time, as it spent an unparalleled 75 weeks on the Hot R&B/Hip-Hop Songs chart, 15 of those weeks at number one. In 2011, VH1 ranked Blige as the 80th greatest artist of all time. Moreover, she was ranked 100th on the list of "100 Greatest Singers of All Time" by Rolling Stone magazine. In 2012, VH1 ranked Blige ninth among "The 100 Greatest Woman in Music" listing.

Blige started her own musical career in 1992, releasing her multi-platinum-selling debut album, What's the 411? on MCA and Uptown Records. The album gave Blige her first Billboard 200 top ten album, and has since launched an additional 12 studio albums in the top ten on this chart. Among Blige's most popular songs to date are "Family Affair", "Real Love", "Not Gon' Cry" and "Be Without You". Blige has had four Billboard Hot 100 top-ten singles as a lead artist in the United States, and has had a total of sixteen top-forty charting singles in the United States. She has had forty-two singles charting on the Billboard Hot 100, making Blige one of the best-performing artists to date on the chart.

Albums

Studio albums

Soundtrack albums

Compilations

Singles

As lead artist

1990s

2000s

2010s

2020s

As a featured artist

Other charted songs

Guest appearances

Soundtrack appearances

See also
 Mary J. Blige videography

Notes

References

External links
 Official website

Discography
Rhythm and blues discographies
Discographies of American artists
Soul music discographies